James Bell (27 August 1872 – 27 December 1955) was a British trade unionist and Labour Party politician who represented Ormskirk from 1918–22. He was described by a fellow union official as "one of the shrewdest negotiators the trade unions in the cotton industry had ever had."

Biography

Bell was born in Darlington, County Durham, the son of John Bell, a coalminer, and his wife, Margaret (née Guy). At age 13, he began working as a cotton weaver at a factory in Haworth, Yorkshire, then moved with his father and brothers to Nelson, Lancashire to work in one of the town's mills. He became involved in trade union activities, leading to his sacking on three occasions. He subsequently moved to the town of Oldham, becoming secretary of the Oldham district of the Amalgamated Weavers' Association in 1905, the first of many posts he held with the organisation over the next 41 years, including vice-president (1930–37) and president (1937–45).

He was the first president of the Oldham Labour Party, and attempted to gain election to the Borough Council without success. In 1918, he was elected as member of parliament for Ormskirk, the first non-Conservative to be elected for this seat since its creation in 1885. This was principally due to a divided Conservative vote between the Coalition Conservatives and the candidate of the National Farmers Union. Bell served only one term in parliament, losing his seat at the next election in 1922.

After leaving parliament, Bell continued his union activities. In 1924, he was appointed secretary of the International Federation of Textile Workers' Associations, and from 1925 to 1931 was secretary of the United Textile Factory Workers Association—known as "the cotton workers parliament." In 1930, he took part in a trade mission to China. He also served on several government commissions and as a member of the National Arbitration Tribunal.

Personal life and death

In 1895, Bell married Elizabeth Hannah Heaton. They had at least six children, including two sons who were in the Army during the First World War. He later lived in Wythenshawe, Manchester. He died, aged 83, at the Oldham and District General Hospital in December 1955.

References

External links
 

1872 births
1955 deaths
Labour Party (UK) MPs for English constituencies
UK MPs 1918–1922
General Secretaries of the United Textile Factory Workers' Association
People from Darlington
People from Oldham
British weavers
Presidents of the Amalgamated Weavers' Association
United Textile Factory Workers' Association-sponsored MPs